The Statute Law Revision Act 1863 is an Act of the Parliament of the United Kingdom. It was intended, in particular, to facilitate the preparation of a revised edition of the statutes.

The enactments which were repealed (whether for the whole or any part of the United Kingdom) by this Act were repealed so far as they extended to the Isle of Man on 25 July 1991.

See also
Statute Law Revision Act

Further reading
Digital reproduction of the Original Act on the Parliamentary Archives catalogue

References
Halsbury's Statutes,
George Kettilby Rickards. The Statutes of the United Kingdom of Great Britain and Ireland, 26 & 27 Victoria, 1863. Queen's Printer. London. 1863. Pages 578 et seq. Digitised copy from Google Books.

External links
  ["Note" and "Schedule" of the bill (unlike the schedule of the act as passed) gives commentary on each scheduled act, noting any earlier repeals and the reason for the new repeal]

United Kingdom Acts of Parliament 1863